Phyllachne is a genus of four cushion plant species in the family Stylidiaceae. Of the four species, two are endemic to New Zealand, while P. colensoi is also native to Tasmania and P. uliginosa is entirely endemic to southern South America and is the only species in the Stylidiaceae native to the Americas. The movement of P. colensoi to colonize Tasmania is a relatively recent move. Molecular studies group P. colensoi, P. clavigera, and P. rubra together in one clade with P. uliginosa in the sister clade. Based on molecular clock data of the rbcL gene, it is estimated that P. uliginosa last shared a common ancestor with the New Zealand clade about 6 million years ago.

References

Stylidiaceae
Asterales genera